USS Ute (AT-76) was a  constructed for the United States Navy during World War II. Her purpose was to aid ships, usually by towing, on the high seas or in combat or post-combat areas, plus "other duties as assigned." She served in the Pacific Ocean and after successful World War II her crew returned home with three battle stars. After being recommissioned in 1951, she saw action in both the Korean War and the Vietnam War earning  two battle stars in Korea and nine campaign stars in Vietnam.

Description

Ute was laid down 27 February 1942 by United Engineering Co., Alameda, California and launched on 24 June 1942. She was commissioned on 12 December 1942  sponsored by Miss Jean Kell; and commissioned on 29 April 1943.

Decommissioning 
Ute was struck from the Naval Register on 23 January 1989 and sunk as a target on 4 August 1991.

Awards 
Ute received three battle stars for World War II service, four battle stars for Korean service and nine campaign stars for Vietnam service.

References

External links 
 

 

Cherokee-class fleet tugs
World War II auxiliary ships of the United States
Ships built in Alameda, California
1942 ships
Ships transferred from the United States Navy to the United States Coast Guard
Ships of the Aleutian Islands campaign